Mat Prakash also known as Medini Prakash was a king of Sirmur State in present-day Himachal Pradesh, India. He ruled from 1684 until his death in 1704. In 1685 he invited Guru Gobind Singh to live in his realm.  Mat Prakash did not join Bhim Chand (Kahlur) and the other local rajas in their wars against the Sikhs.

Sources
The Sikh Encyclopedia article on Prakash

1704 deaths
Indian royalty
Year of birth unknown